Magdalena Mroczkiewicz (born 28 August 1979) is a Polish fencer. She won a silver medal in the women's team foil event at the 2000 Summer Olympics.

References

1979 births
Living people
Polish female fencers
Olympic fencers of Poland
Fencers at the 2000 Summer Olympics
Fencers at the 2008 Summer Olympics
Olympic silver medalists for Poland
Olympic medalists in fencing
Sportspeople from Gdańsk
Medalists at the 2000 Summer Olympics
20th-century Polish women
21st-century Polish women